Pasi Siitonen (born 22 August 1978, in Finland), better known by his stage name Stig or Stig Dogg, is a Finnish hip hop, R&B and country music singer. He has also played in jazz/funk bands like G-Litter, Kuja Orchestra and Raisin Team. He is a studio engineer under the pseudonym Hullukoira at 3rd Rail Music. In 2011 he shortened his name from Stig Dogg to just Stig and sang "Laululeija" in a bid to represent Finland in the Eurovision Song Contest 2012, but came third in the finals with Pernilla Karlsson winning with "När jag blundar".

Stig joined forces with Kuningas Pähkinä and Setä Tamu (a duo already cooperating with each other since 2000) to form in 2012 the group Yön Polte releasing the single "Tyttö sinä olet meritähti". The song peaked at number seven on the Official Finnish Singles Chart.

Siitonen is signed as a writer to Elements Music. He is credited for writing for Elena Paparizou's latest album.

Discography
Albums

Singles

Featured in

References

External links
Myspace

Finnish hip hop musicians
21st-century Finnish male singers
1978 births
Living people
Finnish hip hop record producers
Finnish pop singers